The M5 (Centenary Motorway) is a  motorway in the western suburbs of Brisbane, Australia.

It starts as a two-lane arterial road at Yamanto, travelling to Springfield, where it becomes a two-lane highway and travels across the M2 Logan Motorway at Ellen Grove (formerly Metroad 4 / M4) and ends at Kenmore where it changes its name to the M5 Western Freeway.  It features eight interchanges, the major ones being with the M7 Ipswich Motorway (formerly Metroad 2 / M2) in Darra and another at Sinnamon Park.  The Centenary Freeway links traffic from the west to the north of Brisbane.

In October 2012, it was announced that the planned bikeway from Springfield to the existing bikeway along the Motorway would not proceed.  Instead the existing two lane road would be expanded by two lanes.

Recent Motorway designation
Almost the entire length of road is of motorway standard and has now been designated as such.  Those sections not of freeway standard are being upgraded and re-designated over time. As of October 2006 the blue hexagonal Metroad 5 signage is getting progressively replaced with M5 signage. Officially the M5 starts/ends at the Sumner Road Interchange and not at the M7/M5 Interchange. This will change when the M7/M5 Interchange is upgraded.

The M5 has been identified to receive a major upgrade in the South East Queensland Infrastructure Plan and Program. Additional lanes  will be added to accommodate Transit Lane.

Extension
The motorway was extended to Yamanto and opened in late June 2009.  The extension cost $366 million and was opened by Anna Bligh.  Five bridges along the new section were named after local people, places, events and football teams, including botanist Lloyd Bird and the Box Flat Mine disaster.

Upgrades

Duplicate Centenary Bridge
A project to duplicate the Centenary Bridge, at a cost of $244 million, is due to commence construction in 2022.

Logan Motorway interchange upgrade
A project to upgrade the interchange with Logan Motorway, at a cost of $15 million, was in the detailed design stage in November 2021.

Interchanges 
The interchange with the Logan Motorway is crossed by a viaduct for the two track railway crossing of the Springfield railway line.  The crossing is more than 800 metres long and has been designed so that its piers do not obstruct planned upgrades of both roads.

See also

 Freeways in Australia
 Freeways in Brisbane

References

Highways in Queensland
Roads in Brisbane
Ipswich, Queensland